David Fernandes (born 8 September 1983) is a Portuguese sprint canoer.

He competed at the 2016 Summer Olympics in Rio de Janeiro, in the men's K-4 1000 metres.

References

External links
 
 

1983 births
Living people
Portuguese male canoeists
Olympic canoeists of Portugal
Canoeists at the 2016 Summer Olympics
Place of birth missing (living people)
European Games competitors for Portugal
Canoeists at the 2015 European Games